Lake Independence is located in Marquette County in the Upper Peninsula of the U.S. state of Michigan. The lake is fed primarily by the Yellow Dog River. Outflow is the short Iron River, which flows slightly over  into Lake Superior.

It is located in the eastern part of Powell Township, with the town of Big Bay at the northwest corner of the lake.

It contains many species of fish, including black crappie, bluegill, brown trout, cisco, northern pike, rock bass, smallmouth bass, walleye, white sucker, and yellow perch.

The lake can be accessed by County Road 550. Its recreational uses include swimming and fishing.

See also
List of lakes in Michigan

References
 Map of Lake Independence

Lakes of Michigan
Lakes of Marquette County, Michigan